USS Pampanito (SS-383/AGSS-383), a , was a United States Navy ship, the third one named for the pompano fish. She completed six war patrols from 1944 to 1945 and served as a United States Naval Reserve training ship from 1960 to 1971. She is now a National Historic Landmark, preserved as a memorial and museum ship in the San Francisco Maritime National Park Association located at Fisherman's Wharf in San Francisco, California.

Construction and commissioning
Pampanitos keel was laid down by the Portsmouth Navy Yard in Kittery, Maine, on 15 March 1943. She was launched on 12 July 1943, sponsored by Mrs. James Wolfender, and commissioned on 6 November 1943.

World War II 
After shakedown off New London, Connecticut, Pampanito transited the Panama Canal and arrived at Pearl Harbor, Hawaii, on 14 February 1944.

First patrol, March - May 1944 

Pampanito'''s first war patrol, from 15 March to 2 May, was conducted in the southwest approaches to Saipan and Guam. She served on lifeguard duty south of Yap, then scored two torpedo hits on a destroyer before sailing for Midway Island and Pearl Harbor for refit and repairs to a hull badly damaged by depth charges.

 Second patrol, June - July 1944 Pampanitos second war patrol, from 3 June to 23 July, took place off Kyūshū, Shikoku, and Honshū. On 23 June, a submerged Japanese submarine fired two torpedoes, just missing Pampanito. On 6 July, Pampanito damaged a Japanese gunboat, and 11 days later headed for Midway Island.

On 12 September, she sank 9,419 ton SS Rakuyō Maru, which unfortunately was transporting 1,350 British and Australian POWs, also the 5,135 ton tanker Zuihō Maru, and she damaged a third ship. The Japanese survivors were rescued by an escort vessel, leaving POWs in the water with rafts and some abandoned boats. A total of 1,159 POWs died, of whom some 350 in lifeboats were bombarded and killed by a Japanese naval vessel the next day when they were rowing towards land. On 15 September, Pampanito moved back to the area of the original attack and found men clinging to makeshift rafts. As the sub moved closer, the men were heard to be shouting in English. She then set course for Saipan, disembarked the survivors, and continued on to Pearl Harbor.

Sinking the 1200 ton cargo ship Shinko Maru Number One, 19 November, she damaged a second ship before putting into Fremantle for refit.

 Sixth patrol 

Refitted at Subic Bay, Pampanito returned to the Gulf of Siam for her sixth war patrol.

 1945–1971 

From Pearl Harbor the ship proceeded to San Francisco for overhaul, departing for Pearl Harbor again 1 August. With the end of the war, she was ordered to return to San Francisco. She was decommissioned at Mare Island on 15 December 1945. She remained in reserve until April 1960 when she was assigned to Naval Reserve Training at Mare Island Naval Shipyard. Reclassified AGSS-383', 6 November 1962, she served as a Naval Reserve Training ship at Vallejo, California, until she was stricken from the Navy Register on 20 December 1971.Pampanito earned six battle stars for World War II service.

 Museum ship Pampanito was turned into a memorial and museum at San Francisco on 21 November 1975, transferred to the Maritime Park Association (formerly the National Maritime Museum Association) on 20 May 1976, and opened to the public on 15 March 1982.

In 1986, Pampanito was listed on the National Register of Historic Places and declared to be a National Historic Landmark.

She is now owned and operated by the San Francisco Maritime National Park Association and is moored at Pier 45 in San Francisco's Fisherman's Wharf area, where she is open for visiting.

The USS PAMPANITO Amateur Radio Club brings the radio room to life on the 2nd and 4th Saturdays of each month using the callsign NJ6VTNJVT was the boat's call sign during WWII. Ham radio operators may contact the boat on 7.260 and 14.260 MHz using voice, and on other frequencies using Morse Code.

She flies a broom from her mast, indicating a clean sweep: a successful patrol that "swept the enemy from the seas." In total, she sank six Japanese ships and damaged four others with a total of more than 27,000 tons of enemy shipping sunk.Pampanito has completed four maintenance drydockings since becoming a memorial and museum. "The Pampanito still has several working parts, including one torpedo tube, the periscope, engines, galley and ice-cream maker." The museum runs educational programs including one that allows organized groups of children and adults to sleep overnight in the submarine's 48 bunk beds.

The ship was closed to the public and moved to a dry-dock on 23 September 2016 and returned from Bay Ship & Yacht in Alameda, CA on 14 November 2016 and is currently open to the public.Pampanito and the Liberty ship  were threatened by a four-alarm fire on 23 May 2020, but were saved by local firefighters.

 In film Pampanito played the fictional USS Stingray (SS-161) in the 1996 comedy film Down Periscope. Kelsey Grammer stars as the Stingrays commanding officer, Lieutenant Commander Thomas Dodge, and the film is set on the United States East Coast in the harbors at Charleston, South Carolina, and Norfolk, Virginia. The action scenes use a combination of a special effects shooting miniature for the composited underwater scenes, older Pampanito color stock footage of her under power on the surface, then submerging, and newly shot footage of Pampanito'' moving under tow in San Francisco Bay while venturing past the Golden Gate Bridge. It had been fifty years since she last passed under the bridge.

See also

Bibliography

Footnotes

References

External links 
 
 
 

Balao-class submarines
World War II submarines of the United States
Museum ships in San Francisco
National Historic Landmarks in the San Francisco Bay Area
Ships on the National Register of Historic Places in California
Ships built in Kittery, Maine
1943 ships
Military and war museums in California
Naval museums in the United States
National Register of Historic Places in San Francisco
Museum ships in California
Fisherman's Wharf, San Francisco
World War II on the National Register of Historic Places in California